The Swining is a 1993 album released by Raymond Watts (as PIG). It was released exclusively in Japan, being re-released in the United States by Cleopatra Records in 1999 as part of The Swining/Red Raw & Sore. Music videos for the songs "The Fountain of Miracles" and "The Seven Veils" were filmed but remain unreleased outside Japan. They exist in bootleg form around the internet and YouTube.

Release
The album was originally released by Alfa in Japan in 1993, but in America, 1999, Cleopatra remastered the album with different tracks as "The Swining / Red Raw & Sore. In this album, two versions of the song “Rope” were swapped and “Symphony for the Devil” was edited. The song "The Fountain of Failure" is formally known as "The Fountain Of Miracles (Anal-Log Mix) (Instrumental)", from the single The Fountain Of Miracles.

Track listing

Original (Japanese) release
 "The Fountain of Miracles" – 5:51
 "The Seven Veils" – 4:08
 "Rope" – 4:43
 "Find It, Fuck It, Forget It" – 2:49
 "Black Mambo" – 5:05
 "Ojo Por Ojo" – 2:15
 "Blades" – 6:40
 "Symphony for the Devil" – 12:43

US release
 "The Fountain of Miracles" – 5:52
 "The Seven Veils" – 4:10
 "Rope (Keith LeBlanc Remix)" – 4:32
 "Find It, Fuck It, Forget It" – 2:51
 "Black Mambo" – 5:07
 "Ojo Por Ojo" – 2:18
 "Blades" – 6:42
 "Symphony for the Devil" – 11:58
 "Red Raw & Sore" – 5:40
 "Rope" – 4:46
 "Blades (KMFDM Mix)" – 6:02
 "The Fountain of Miracles (Pig Remix)" – 6:35
 "One Meatball" – 5:19
 "The Fountain of Failure" – 7:10

All songs were written by Raymond Watts.

Personnel
Raymond Watts - vocals, programming
Karl Hyde – guitars
Steve White – guitars (3, 9, 11-14)
Enrico Thomaso – flugelhorn
Sugar J – breaks (3, 10, 14)
Mike Watts – backing vocals

References

Pig (musical project) albums
1993 albums